Tuli College, is the general degree college in Tuli, Mokokchung, Nagaland. It offers undergraduate courses in arts and is affiliated to Nagaland University. This college was established in 1996.

Departments

Arts
English 
History 
Political Science 
Geography
Economics
Education
Environmental Studies

Accreditation
The college is recognized by the University Grants Commission (UGC).

References

External links
http://tulicollege.com/

Colleges affiliated to Nagaland University
Universities and colleges in Nagaland
Educational institutions established in 1996
1996 establishments in Nagaland